The Zentralverband der deutschen Konsumgenossenschaften, or ZDK is for over one hundred years the syndicate of the Consumer Co-operatives in Germany. Today the federation, which stands in the Lassalle tradition of Cooperative continues to develop the cooperative thought, by promoting the reestablishment of cooperatives in the service sector.

See also 
 Deutscher Genossenschafts-und Raiffeisenverband

External links 

 Zentralverband deutscher Konsumgenossenschaften e.V

Cooperative federations
Cooperatives in Germany